was the 15th of 24 s, built for the Imperial Japanese Navy following World War I. When introduced into service, these ships were the most powerful destroyers in the world. They served as first-line destroyers through the 1930s, and remained formidable weapons systems well into the Pacific War. She is most famous for ramming the PT-109 commanded by Lieutenant John F. Kennedy, who would later become the 35th President of the United States.

History
Construction of the advanced Fubuki-class destroyers was authorized as part of the Imperial Japanese Navy's expansion program from fiscal 1923, intended to give Japan a qualitative edge with the world's most modern ships. The Fubuki class had performance that was a quantum leap over previous destroyer designs, so much so that they were designated . The large size, powerful engines, high speed, large radius of action and unprecedented armament gave these destroyers the firepower similar to many light cruisers in other navies. Amagiri, built at the Ishikawajima Shipyards in Tokyo was the fifth in an improved series, which incorporated a modified gun turret which could elevate her main battery of /50 cal Type 3 naval guns to 75° as opposed to the original 40°, thus permitting the guns to be used as dual purpose guns against aircraft. Amagiri was laid down on 28 November 1928, launched on 27 February 1930 and commissioned on 10 November 1930. Originally assigned hull designation “Destroyer No. 49”, she was designated Amagiri before her launch.

Inter-war period
In 1935, after the Fourth Fleet Incident, in which a large number of ships were damaged by a typhoon, Amagiri, along with her sister ships, were modified with stronger hulls and increased displacement. In 1937, Amagiri covered landing of Japanese forces in Shanghai and Hangzhou during the Second Sino-Japanese War. In 1940, she was assigned to patrol and cover landings of Japanese forces in south China, and subsequently participated in the Invasion of French Indochina.

World War II

Early operations
At the time of the attack on Pearl Harbor, Amagiri was assigned to Destroyer Division 20 of Desron 3 of the IJN 1st Fleet, and had deployed from Kure Naval District to the port of Samah on Hainan Island. From 4 December 1941, to the end of the year, Amagiri covered the landings of Japanese troops in Malaya, and was part of the escort in support of "Operation L" (the invasion of Banka and Palembang in the Netherlands East Indies. At the end of February, Amagiri covered minesweeping operations around Singapore and Johore. In March, Amagiri was assigned to "Operation T" (the invasion of northern Sumatra) and "Operation D" (the invasion of the Andaman Islands). During the Indian Ocean raids, Amagiri — together with the heavy cruisers  and  sank the British passenger ship Dardanus, Steamship Gandara and Merchant ship Indora. From 13–22 April, Amagiri returned via Singapore and Camranh Bay to Kure Naval Arsenal, for maintenance.

On 4–5 June, Amagiri participated in the Battle of Midway as part of the Aleutian Invasion force and was subsequently based at Amami-Ōshima for patrols of southern waters until mid-July. In July 1942, Amagiri sailed from Amami-Ōshima to Mako Guard District, Singapore, Sabang and Mergui for a projected second Indian Ocean raid. The operation was cancelled due to the Guadalcanal campaign, and Amagiri was ordered to Truk instead, arriving in late August.

After the Battle of the Eastern Solomons on 24 August, Amagiri took on troops from transport ships while at sea, and sailed on to Guadalcanal. After rescuing the Asagiri survivors, she towed Shirakumo to Shortland Island. Amagiri continued to be used on numerous "Tokyo Express" transport missions to various locations in the Solomon Islands in September.

Although reassigned to the IJN 8th Fleet in October, Amagiri continued to be used for "Tokyo Express" missions through the end of the year. After the Naval Battle of Guadalcanal from 13–15 November, she assisted destroyer  in the rescue of 1,500 survivors of the merchant vessels Canberra Maru and Nagara Maru, and escorted the damaged Sado Maru to the Shortlands. She returned to Kure Naval Arsenal for repairs by mid-January 1943.

Amagiri returned to Rabaul by March 1943, and resumed its missions as a high speed transport. On 7 April, she was strafed by a USAAF B-17 Flying Fortress bomber, killing 10 crewmen. On 5–6 July, during the Battle of Kula Gulf Amagiri was engaged by United States Navy destroyers and cruisers while attempting a troop transport mission to Kolombangara. She took five shell hits, which killed 10 crewmen.

John F. Kennedy and PT-109

On 2 August, while returning from another "Tokyo Express" night reinforcement fast transport mission to Vila, Amagiri rammed and sank the US torpedo boat PT-109, commanded by Lieutenant, junior grade (and future US president) John F. Kennedy. It is widely believed that those aboard Amagiri were not even aware of PT-109, which was difficult to see because of its small size and lack of lights. However, Robert J. Donovan in his book PT 109: John F. Kennedy in WWII, after interviewing many of the crew, concludes that it was not an accident, and he talked to the man at the wheel who was ordered to steer for a collision course. Amagiri also engaged other PT boats in the Blackett Strait south of Kolombangara. Lieutenant Commander  – who commanded Amagiri at that time – attended President Kennedy's inauguration in 1961.

The incident would be publicized in several books, a movie, and a hit song by Jimmy Dean, as "the Jap destroyer in the night, cut the 109 in two", making it probably the only Japanese ship to ever be mentioned in the top ten of the Billboard Hot 100 singles charts.

Subsequent career
Amagiri continued to be used on "Tokyo Express" missions through the end of 1943. She engaged United States Navy destroyers in combat at the Battle of Cape St. George in late November, and escaped pursuing American destroyers led by Captain Arleigh Burke. On 7 December, she collided near Kavieng with the destroyer , which sheared off her bow. Sent back to Kure Naval Arsenal for repairs in January 1944, she was reassigned to the Southwest Area Fleet in March and was based in Singapore to provide escort for transport missions in the western Netherlands East Indies. As she took over two hours to sink, there were few casualties.

Amagiri was struck from the Navy List on 10 June 1944.

Wreck
Amagiri was located in October 2003 by Vidar Skoglie and the MV Empress. She lies in 28m/98 feet of water on her starboard side and was heavily collapsing and split open due to apparent illegal dynamite fishing near the wreck. One dynamite fisher apparently detonated the forward magazine, as no detonation was noted during her sinking.  This resulted in much of the forward part of the ship being heavily damaged. The bow of the ship was relatively intact and still sat vertically. Live torpedoes were scattered around the wreck as well as depth charges, making it a hazardous dive. Since then the Amagiri was illegally broken up and salvaged, and little if anything remains of the wreck.

References

Bibliography

Further reading

Duane T. Hove, American Warriors: Five Presidents in the Pacific Theater of World War II (2003) 
Robert J. Donovan, PT 109: John F. Kennedy in WWII (1961)  Donovan interviewed much of the original crew in Japan.

External links

Fubuki-class destroyers
Ships built by IHI Corporation
1930 ships
Second Sino-Japanese War naval ships of Japan
World War II destroyers of Japan
Maritime incidents in April 1944
Ships sunk by mines
Shipwrecks in the Makassar Strait
World War II shipwrecks in the Pacific Ocean